Prototype is an album by the Jeff Lorber Fusion that was released on March 24, 2017. The album earned the group a Grammy Award for Best Contemporary Instrumental Album.

Track listing 
All songs written by Jeff Lorber. "Hidden Agenda" co-written with Jimmy Haslip.

Personnel 
 Jeff Lorber – keyboards, guitars (3, 7, 9), synth bass (3, 4, 6, 8, 9)
 Paul Jackson, Jr. – guitars (1, 7, 8), rhythm guitar (1, 7, 8), guitar solo (7)
 Chuck Loeb – melody guitar (1)
 Michael Thompson – guitars (2, 3, 4, 6-10)
 Jairus Mozee – guitars (3, 4)
 Larry Koonse – guitars (5, 8), guitar solo (5, 8)
 Nathan East – bass (1)
 Jimmy Haslip – electric bass (2, 3, 4, 6, 7, 9, 10), bass (5)
 Gary Novak – drums 
 Andy Snitzer – alto saxophone (1, 2, 3, 6-9), tenor saxophone (4, 5), soprano saxophone (8, 10)
 David Mann – horns (1-4, 6, 7, 9), horn arrangements (1-4, 6, 7, 9), orchestra and string arrangements (10)

Production 
 Jeff Lorber – producer, recording, mixing (1, 2, 5, 7, 10)
 Jimmy Haslip – producer
 Peter Mokran – mixing (3, 4, 6, 8, 9)
 Michael Thompson – guitar recording (2, 3, 4, 6-10)
 David Mann – horn recording (1-4, 6, 7, 9)
 Gavin Lurssen – mastering at Lurssen Mastering (Los Angeles, California).
 Raifi Minasian – graphic and package design 
 Alex Solca – photography 
 Bud Harner – management
 Alle Paone – management
 Chapman & Co. – management company

Charts

References

2017 albums
Grammy Award for Best Contemporary Instrumental Album
Jeff Lorber albums